During the decade of the 2000s many Scottish bands and individual performers made recordings in the rock, Scottish folk, Celtic fusion, and other genres. Scottish music received support from two public bodies: the Scottish Arts Council and Scottish Enterprise. Scotland's largest city Glasgow was described by Time magazine in 2004 as "Europe's capital of rock music", and became a UNESCO City of Music in 2008. The decade brought the deaths of Scottish musicians Kirsty MacColl and Martyn Bennett.

Births and deaths

Deaths
 Kirsty MacColl (1959–2000)
 Martyn Bennett (1971–2005)

Recordings 
 2000 
Nàdurra, Capercaillie
Fold Your Hands Child, You Walk Like a Peasant, Belle & Sebastian
100 broken windows, Idlewild
The Great Eastern, The Delgados
 2001 
Da Farder Ben Da Welcomer, Fiddler's Bid
Loss, Mull Historical Society
The Invisible Band, Travis
Persevere, The Proclaimers
Outlaws and Dreamers, Dick Gaughan
 2002 
Time and Tide, Battlefield Band
The Remote Part, Idlewild
Storytelling, Belle & Sebastian
Blackened Sky, Biffy Clyro
Hate, The Delgados
Prentice Piece, Dick Gaughan
 2003 
Choice Language, Capercaillie
Dear Catastrophe Waitress, Belle & Sebastian
Vertigo of Bliss, Biffy Clyro
Us, Mull Historical Society
12 Memories, Travis
Born Innocent, The Proclaimers
 2004 
Franz Ferdinand, Franz Ferdinand
Young Forever, Aberfeldy
Infinity Land, Biffy Clyro
Universal Audio, The Delgados
This Is Hope, Mull Historical Society
Eye to the Telescope, KT Tunstall
 2005
Eye To The Telescope, KT Tunstall 
Push Barman to Open Old Wounds, Belle & Sebastian
Warnings/Promises, Idlewild
Croftwork, Peatbog Faeries
You Could Have It So Much Better, Franz Ferdinand
Restless Soul, The Proclaimers
 2006 
These Streets, Paolo Nutini
The Life Pursuit, Belle and Sebastian
Lucky For Some, Dick Gaughan
Esoteric Escape,  Keser
 2007 
Templeton/Instinct, Desolation Yes
This Is the Life, Amy Macdonald
 2008 
Glasvegas, Glasvegas
The Midnight Organ Fight, Frightened Rabbit
 2009 
Sunny Side Up, Paolo Nutini
Tonight: Franz Ferdinand, Franz Ferdinand We'll Make Our History EP, The Void

References

Scottish music
2000s in British music
2000s in Scotland